In algebraic number theory, the Ferrero–Washington theorem, proved first by  and later by ,  states that Iwasawa's μ-invariant vanishes for cyclotomic Zp-extensions of abelian algebraic number fields.

History
 introduced the μ-invariant of a Zp-extension and observed that it was zero in all cases he calculated.  used a computer to check that it vanishes for the cyclotomic Zp-extension of the rationals for all primes less than 4000. 
 later conjectured that the μ-invariant vanishes for any Zp-extension, but shortly after  discovered examples of non-cyclotomic extensions of number fields with non-vanishing μ-invariant showing that his original conjecture was wrong. He suggested, however, that the conjecture might still hold for cyclotomic Zp-extensions.

 showed that the vanishing of the μ-invariant for cyclotomic Zp-extensions of the rationals is equivalent to certain congruences between Bernoulli numbers, and  showed that the μ-invariant vanishes in these cases by proving that these congruences hold.

Statement
Let the Tate module 

Then Tp(K) is a pro-p-group and so a Zp-module.  Using class field theory one can describe Tp(K) as isomorphic to the inverse limit of the class groups Cm of the Km under norm.

Iwasawa exhibited Tp(K) as a module over the completion Zp and this implies a formula for the exponent of p in the order of the class groups Cm of the form

The Ferrero–Washington theorem states that μ is zero.

References

 (And correction )

Theorems in algebraic number theory